Walter Bailey (1876 – after 1895) was an English professional footballer who played as an inside forward.

References

1876 births
Footballers from Birmingham, West Midlands
English footballers
Association football inside forwards
Grimsby Town F.C. players
English Football League players
Year of death missing